The Police Service of Northern Ireland (PSNI; ;)
is the police force that serves Northern Ireland. It is the successor to the Royal Ulster Constabulary (RUC) after it was reformed and renamed in 2001 on the recommendation of the Patten Report.

Although the majority of PSNI officers are Ulster Protestants, this dominance is not as pronounced as it was in the RUC because of positive action policies. The RUC was a militarised police force and played a key role in policing the violent conflict known as the Troubles. As part of the Good Friday Agreement, there was an agreement to introduce a new police service initially based on the body of constables of the RUC. As part of the reform, an Independent Commission on Policing for Northern Ireland (the Patten Commission) was set up, and the RUC was replaced by the PSNI on 4 November 2001. The Police (Northern Ireland) Act 2000 named the new police service as the Police Service of Northern Ireland (incorporating the Royal Ulster Constabulary); shortened to Police Service of Northern Ireland for operational purposes.

All major political parties in Northern Ireland now support the PSNI. At first, Sinn Féin, which represented about a quarter of Northern Ireland voters at the time, refused to endorse the PSNI until the Patten Commission's recommendations were implemented in full. However, as part of the St Andrews Agreement, Sinn Féin announced its full acceptance of the PSNI in January 2007.

In comparison with the other 44 territorial police forces of the United Kingdom, the PSNI is the third largest in terms of officer numbers (after the Metropolitan Police Service and Police Scotland) and the second largest in terms of geographic area of responsibility, after Police Scotland. The PSNI is about half the size of Garda Síochána in terms of officer numbers.

Organisation
The senior officer in charge of the PSNI is its chief constable. The chief constable is appointed by the Northern Ireland Policing Board, subject to the approval of the Minister of Justice for Northern Ireland. The Chief Constable of Northern Ireland is the third-highest paid police officer in the UK (after the Commissioner and Deputy Commissioner of the Metropolitan Police).

The police area is divided into eight districts, each headed by a chief superintendent. Districts are divided into areas, commanded by a chief inspector; these in turn are divided into sectors, commanded by inspectors. In recent years, under new structural reforms, some chief inspectors command more than one area as the PSNI strives to make savings.

In 2001 the old police divisions and sub-divisions were replaced with 29 district command units (DCUs), broadly coterminous with local council areas. In 2007 the DCUs were replaced by eight districts ('A' to 'H') in anticipation of local government restructuring under the Review of Public Administration. Responsibility for policing and justice was devolved to the Northern Ireland Assembly on 9 March 2010, although direction and control of the PSNI remains under the chief constable.

In addition to the PSNI, there are other agencies which have responsibility for specific parts of Northern Ireland's transport infrastructure:

 Belfast Harbour Police
 Belfast International Airport Constabulary

Jurisdiction
PSNI officers have full powers of a constable throughout Northern Ireland and the adjacent United Kingdom waters. Other than in mutual aid circumstances they have more limited powers of a constable in the other two legal jurisdictions of the United Kingdom—England and Wales, and Scotland. Police staff, although non-warranted members of the service, contribute to both back-office, operational support and front-line services, sometimes operating alongside warranted colleagues.

Co-operation with Garda Síochána
The Patten Report recommended that a programme of long-term personnel exchanges should be established between the PSNI and the Garda Síochána, the national police force of the Republic of Ireland. This recommendation was enacted in 2002 by an Inter-Governmental Agreement on Policing Cooperation, which set the basis for the exchange of officers between the two services. There are three levels of exchanges:

Personnel exchanges, for all ranks, without policing powers and for a term up to one year
Secondments: for ranks from sergeant to chief superintendent, with policing powers, for up to three years
Lateral entry by the permanent transfer of officers for ranks above inspector and under assistant commissioner

The protocols for these movements of personnel were signed by both the Chief Constable of the PSNI and the Garda Commissioner on 21 February 2005.

Accountability
The PSNI is supervised by the Northern Ireland Policing Board.

The Police Ombudsman for Northern Ireland deals with any complaints regarding the PSNI, and investigates any allegations of misconduct by police officers. Police staff do not fall under the ombudsman's jurisdiction. The current Police Ombudsman is former Oversight Commissioner Michael Maguire, who took over from Al Hutchinson in July 2012. The Oversight Commissioner was appointed to ensure that the Patten recommendations were implemented 'comprehensively and faithfully', and attempted to assure the community that all aspects of the report were being implemented and being seen to be implemented. The oversight role ended on 31 May 2007, with the final report indicating that of Patten's 175 recommendations, 140 had been completed with a further 16 "substantially completed".

The PSNI is also internally regulated by its Professional Standards Department, who can direct local "professional standards champions" (superintendents at district level) to investigate relatively minor matters, while a "misconduct panel" will consider more serious misconduct issues. Outcomes from misconduct hearings include dismissal, a requirement to resign, reduction in rank, monetary fines and cautions.

Recruitment

The PSNI was initially legally obliged to operate an affirmative action policy of recruiting 50% of its trainee officers from a Catholic background and 50% from a non-Catholic background, as recommended by the Patten Report, in order to address the under-representation of Catholics that had existed for many decades in policing; in 2001 the RUC was almost 92% Protestant. Many unionist politicians said the "50:50" policy was unfair, and when the Bill to set up the PSNI was going through Parliament, Minister of State Adam Ingram stated: "Dominic Grieve referred to positive discrimination and we hold our hands up. Clause 43 refers to discrimination and appointments and there is no point in saying that that is anything other than positive discrimination." However, the Northern Ireland Human Rights Commission cited international human rights law to show that special measures to secure minority participation were in accordance with human rights standards and did not in law constitute 'discrimination'.

By February 2011, 29.7% of the 7,200 officers were from a Catholic background, but among the 2,500 police staff (non-warranted members), where the 50:50 rule operated only for larger recruitment drives, the proportion of Catholics was just 18%. The British Government nevertheless proposed to end the 50:50 measure, and provisions for 'lateral entry' of Catholic officers from other police forces, with effect from the end of March 2011. Following a public consultation the special measures were ended in respect of police officers and police staff in April 2011.

Deloitte conducted recruitment exercises on behalf of the PSNI, and was the dominant firm in the Consensia Partnership which existed from 2001 to 2009.

As of 2017, the PSNI have announced that it will be introducing new schemes to increase the number of Catholics in the force. The PSNI is focusing on tackling the fear factor of joining the service as violent dissident Republicans are discouraging Catholics from joining and continue to attack Catholic officers.

Policies
In September 2006 it was confirmed that Assistant Chief Constable Judith Gillespie approved the PSNI policy of using children as informants including in exceptional circumstances to inform on their own family but not their parents. The document added safeguards including having a parent or "appropriate adult" present at meetings between juveniles and their handler. It also stressed a child's welfare should be paramount when considering the controversial tactics and required that any risk had been properly explained to them and a risk assessment completed.

Specialist units

Armed Response Unit
Specially-trained Armed Response Unit (ARU) officers support other parts of PSNI when faced with people who are carrying weapons such as knives and firearms.

Headquarters Mobile Support Unit
Headquarters Mobile Support Unit (HMSU) officers are trained to Specialist Firearms Officer (SFO) and Counter Terrorist Specialist Firearms Officer (CTSFO) standards. HMSU officers undergo a 26-week training program including firearms, unarmed combat, roping, driving and photography.

HMSU is the tactical unit of the PSNI.

Tactical Support Group
Tactical Support Group (TSG) officers provide a range of core and specialist services to district policing teams.

Core TSG functions include public order, counter terrorism and crime reduction, community safety, crime scene response, and surveillance capability.

Specialist TSG skills include:

 specialist search teams
 police search advisors (polsa)
 method of entry – gain entry to premises 
 specialist counter terrorist / anti-crime patrols 
 marine response
 enhanced medical aid 
 high risk escorts
 chemical biological radiological nuclearesponse
 close protection 
 roads policing 
 mutual aid to other uk police services
 public order

Uniform

The colour of the PSNI uniform is bottle green. Pre-1970s RUC uniforms retained a dark green called rifle green, which was often mistaken as black. A lighter shade of green was introduced following the Hunt Report in the early 1970s, although Hunt recommended that British blue should be introduced. The Patten report, however, recommended the retention of the green uniform (Recommendation No. 154). The RUC officially described this as 'rifle green'. When the six new versions of the PSNI uniform were introduced, in March 2002, the term 'bottle green' was used for basically the same colour to convey a less militaristic theme.
In 2018 a formal review was launched about the current uniform after officers gave feedback on it. 

On 31 January 2022 a new uniform was introduced for frontline officers. This change replaced the white shirt and tie that was worn since 2001 with a green wicking material t-shirt.  This new style shirt is embroidered with the PSNI crest on the left breast and the word Police on the left collar and both sleeves. The new shirt also facilitates the wearing of epaulettes to display rank and numerals. This modern workwear is similar to Police Scotland aside from colour and some police services in England and Wales. Officer headwear has remained the same and traditionally consists of peaked forage caps for males and kepi style hats for females. Baseball style caps are worn by tactical units.

Badge and flag
The PSNI badge features the St. Patrick's saltire, and six symbols representing different and shared traditions:
 The Scales of Justice (representing equality and justice)
 A crown (a traditional symbol of royalty but not the St Edward's Crown worn by or representing the British Sovereign)
 The harp (a traditional Irish symbol but not the Brian Boru harp used as an official emblem in the Republic)
 A torch (representing enlightenment and a new beginning)
 An olive branch (a peace symbol from Ancient Greece)
 A shamrock (a traditional Irish symbol, used by St Patrick, patron saint of all Ireland, to explain the Christian Trinity)

The flag of the PSNI is the badge in the centre of a dark green field. Under the Police Emblems and Flags Regulations (Northern Ireland) 2002 no other flag can be used by the PSNI and it is the only one permitted to be flown on any PSNI building, vehicle, aircraft or vessel.

Equipment

Body armour

PSNI officers routinely wear bulletproof vests and in recent years have been issued the stab vests worn by most UK police officers and the Gardaí. Beginning in December 2007 bulletproof vests were required for PSNI officers patrolling in the Greater Belfast and Greater Derry City areas owing to the threat from dissident republicans. In 2009 the PSNI issued an upgraded and redesigned bulletproof vest to operational officers. While the bulletproof vest offers a high level of ballistic protection many officers prefer the lighter and more comfortable stab vest. Both are issued to each operational officer and the wearing of body armour generally comes down to personal preference, except in areas of high threat.

Firearms
The elevated threat level posed by armed paramilitary groups means that, unlike the majority of police services in the United Kingdom and the Garda Síochána in the neighbouring Republic of Ireland, all PSNI officers receive firearms training and are routinely armed while on duty, with officers also being allowed to carry firearms while off-duty.
Historically, RUC officers were issued with the Ruger Speed-Six revolver and had access to the Heckler & Koch MP5 submachine gun and the Heckler & Koch G3 and Heckler & Koch HK33 rifles (which replaced the earlier Sterling submachine guns and Ruger AC-556 select-fire rifles between 1992 and 1995), with the PSNI inheriting these weapons upon formation; subsequently, the Glock 17 pistol began superseding the Speed-Six revolvers from 2002 onwards, with only fifteen revolvers remaining in service a decade later, while Heckler & Koch G36 variants were procured to supplement the MP5, G3, and HK33. L104 riot guns are available for crowd control purposes. Long arms are still routinely carried in areas of higher threat such as Derry Cityside, North and West Belfast or various border areas.

Vehicles 

The best known PSNI vehicle is the Land Rover Tangi but with the improving security situation these are less likely to be used for everyday patrols and are more likely to be used for crowd control instead. In 2011 it was announced that some of the Tangis were to be replaced, due to the ongoing security threat and the age of the current fleet. This led to the creation of the PANGOLIN – Armoured Public Order Vehicle – designed and built by OVIK Special Vehicles (part of the OVIK Group), 60 Mk1 and 90 Mk2 variants have been delivered and are currently in service. Also a number of Public Order Land Rovers made by Penman are also currently in service.

In addition to other cars, vans and motorcycles, the PSNI also have a fleet of 242 bicycles which are used for city centres and walkway patrols.

Air support  
In 2014 the Air Support Unit responded to over 4,000 callouts, 12 were Casualty evacuations and participated in over 250 missing people searches. All aircraft are used for investigations, anti-crime operations, traffic management, search and rescue, public order situations, crime reduction initiatives and tackling terrorism.

Helicopters 

In May 2005, the PSNI took delivery of its first helicopter, a Eurocopter EC 135, registration G-PSNI and callsign Police 44. In 2010, the PSNI took delivery of its second aircraft, a Eurocopter EC 145 registration G-PSNO and callsign Police 45 at a cost of £7million. In July 2013, a third helicopter entered service, Eurocopter EC 145, registration G-PSNR and callsign Police 46.

Fixed wing aircraft 
The PSNI operates two fixed wing aircraft for aerial surveillance. In August 1992, a Britten-Norman BN-2T Islander entered service with registration G-BSWR and callsign Scout 1. In July 2011, the aircraft sustained damage during a crash-landing at Aldergrove. In June 2013, prior to the G8 summit, a Britten-Norman Defender 4000 entered service with registration G-CGTC and callsign Scout 2.

Other items
Other items of equipment include Hiatt Speedcuffs, CS (irritant) Spray, Monadnock autolock batons with power safety tip and Hindi cap, a first aid pouch, a TETRA radio (Motorola MTH800) and a torch with traffic wand, Limb Restraints, finally the PSNI plan to distribute 2100 BlackBerry devices to officers by the end of March 2011 and by March 2012 they plan to distribute an additional 2000 devices.

Headquarters
The service's headquarters are located in Knock, an area in east Belfast.

List of chief constables

Ranks

In the PSNI there are also Special constables known as a Reserve Constable which can be part or full time positions.
The ranks and their insignia correspond to those of other UK police services, with a few modifications. Sergeants' chevrons are worn point-up as is done in the United States, rather than point-down as is done in other police and military services of the United Kingdom. The six-pointed star & saltire device from the PSNI badge is used in place of the Crown in the insignia of superintendents, chief superintendents and the chief constable. The rank insignia of the chief constable, unlike those in other parts of the UK, are similar to those of the Commissioner of Police of the Metropolis and the Commissioner of the City of London Police.

See also
List of law enforcement agencies in Northern Ireland
Law enforcement in the United Kingdom
List of Government departments and agencies in Northern Ireland
Northern Ireland Security Guard Service
PSNI F.C.
PSNI GAA

References
Weitzer, Ronald. 1995. Policing Under Fire: Ethnic Conflict and Police-Community Relations in Northern Ireland (Albany, New York: State University of New York Press).
Weitzer, Ronald. 1996. "Police Reform in Northern Ireland", Police Studies, v.19, no.2. pages:27–43.
Weitzer, Ronald. 1992. "Northern Ireland's Police Liaison Committees", Policing and Society, vol.2, no.3, pages 233–243.

Footnotes

External links 

 
The badge and flag of the PSNI
Police Ombudsman for Northern Ireland website
PSNI Roll Of Honour 

 
Government of Northern Ireland
Society of Northern Ireland
Northern Ireland
Organizations established in 2001
2001 establishments in Northern Ireland
Northern Ireland peace process